Igor Dokmanović (born 6 September 1973 in Rijeka) is a Croatian handball coach and former player. He is currently head coach at Norwegian club Bergsøy IL and since January 2018 coach at Kosovo men's national handball team.

In October 2012 Dokmanović became interim head coach of RK Zamet before the arrival of Irfan Smajlagić. He coached the team for one match which they won away against Gorica.

Honours

Player
RK Zamet
Croatian First A League Vice champions (1): 1992
Croatian First B League (1): 1995-96

Rudar Labin
Croatian First B League (1): 1999-2000

References

1973 births
Living people
Croatian male handball players
Handball players from Rijeka
RK Zamet players
RK Crikvenica players
RK Zamet coaches
RK Crikvenica coaches
Croatian expatriate sportspeople in Norway